The 2016–17 ISU Speed Skating World Cup, officially the ISU World Cup Speed Skating 2016–2017, was a series of international speed skating competitions that ran the entire season. The season started on 11 November 2016 in Harbin, China, and ended with the final on 11 March 2017 in Stavanger, Norway.

In total, six competition weekends were held at six different locations, 18 cups were contested (nine for men, and nine for women), and 88 races took place. Additionally, there were two Grand World Cups, one for men and one for women, in which all individual races, regardless of distance, counted.

The World Cup is organized by the International Skating Union (ISU).

Calendar
The detailed schedule for the season.

Note: the men's 5000 and 10000 metres were contested as one cup, and the women's 3000 and 5000 metres were contested as one cup, as indicated by the color coding.

In addition, there were two combination cups, the allround combination and the sprint combination. For the allround combination, the distances were 1500 + 5000 metres for men, and 1500 + 3000 metres for women. For the sprint combination, the distances were 500 + 1000 metres, both for men and women. These cups were contested only in World Cup 5, in Berlin, Germany.

Entry rules

Qualification criteria

In order to qualify, skaters had to achieve the following results in ISU events, international competitions or national championships between 1 July 2015 and the entry deadline for the competition concerned.

 in the Olympic Oval, Calgary, the Utah Olympic Oval, Salt Lake City, or the Xinjiang Ice Sports Center, Ürümqi
 in other ice rinks
 or 6:35.00 on 5000 m
 or 6:40.00 on 5000 m
 or 4:15.00 on 3000 m
 or 4:20.00 on 3000 m

For the mass start and team pursuit events, skaters who had achieved any one of the above results were qualified. However, every ISU member nation was allowed to enter a maximum of one skater per gender who had not achieved any of these results, provided that they had achieved a 1500 m result of 1:57.50 (men) or 2:10.00 (women).

Nation quotas
Every ISU member nation was allowed to enter at least one competitor for each distance, subject to the qualification criteria above. Additionally, countries placed among the top 40 in the final 2015–16 World Cup were allowed an additional entry per top 40 (though 5 riders in the top 40 were required to have the full quotum of 5). The maximum quota was 5 skaters. A member nation organizing a World Cup competition was granted the maximum quota in all events. Member nations not mentioned were allowed to enter a maximum of one skater for each distance.

For the mass start event, a member nation was allowed to enter a maximum of two skaters, all subject to the qualifying criteria above. For the team pursuit and team sprint events, a member nation was allowed to enter one team only per category (men/women).

The World Cup competitions 1–4 served as qualifying events for the 2017 European Championships and 2017 World Single Distance Championships. World Cup 5 served as a qualifying event for the 2017 World Allround Championships and 2017 World Sprint Championships. Results from World Cups 1–5 defined the seeding for the Single Distance Championships. World Cup 5 had extended entry quotas due to its status as qualifying event; each ISU member nation got one more quota place than its highest quota of either of the two distances in the competition, however, the maximum quota was still 5 places.

Competition format

Seeding of skaters

If the number of entered skaters exceeded a certain limit, skaters competed in two separate divisions, A and B. In the first competition, the composition of skaters in the respective division was determined by the ranking of the skaters in the respective distance category from the 2015–16 World Cup and the seeding submitted by the respective team leaders before the draw. For each country and distance category, the number of skaters in the ranking top of the previous year decided the number of places available in Division A, but the team leader's seeding decided which skater goes into which division.

In the following competitions, the current World Cup ranking was used, with special considerations to top-placed skaters in Division B of the previous competition. A skater was also under certain conditions allowed to apply for a wild card for Division A, but only the first time the skater participated in a distance category, and not in the first and last competitions of the season. In the last competition for the season, there was no Division B.

Points system

Points tables

World Cup points for all competitions, except the last, were awarded in both divisions, using two sets of tables, A1/B1 and A2/B2. Tables A1 and B1 were used when the number of competitors in Division A exceeded 16, while tables A2 and B2 were used when that number was between 12 and 16. However, if table B1 was used for Division B in the first race in an event that is raced twice in the same competition, it was used also in the second race, regardless of the number of competitors in Division A.

For the last competition, since there was no Division B, points were awarded using table A3.

Mass start ranking

The mass start races were over 20 laps for men and 15 laps for women. There were three intermediate sprints, at 5, 10 and 15 laps for men, and at 4, 8 and 12 laps for women. Race points were awarded to the four first skaters at the intermediate sprints, and to the six first skaters at the final sprint. The accumulated points a skater collected during a race decided the final ranking. For skaters who were tied in race points, including those who had failed to collect any, their finishing order broke the tie.

Grand World Cup

In order to determine an overall World Cup winner, one for men and one for women, a special points system was used, awarding points for the top five skaters in each individual event.

Note: half points were awarded in distances that were skated twice in the same competition.

Prize money

Note: half amounts were awarded in distances that were skated twice in the same competition.

Additionally, the Grand World Cup winner of each category (men/women) was awarded $20000.

World records

World records going into the 2016–17 season.

Men

{| class="wikitable" border="1" style="text-align:center"
|-
! Distance
! Time
! Holder(s)
! Nat.
! Date
! Venue
! Reference
|-
| 500 m
| 33.98
| align=left | Pavel Kulizhnikov
| 
| align=right | 20 November 2015
| align=left | Utah Olympic Oval, Salt Lake City
| 
|-
| 1000 m
| 1:06.42
| align=left | Shani Davis
| 
| align=right | 7 March 2009
| align=left | Utah Olympic Oval, Salt Lake City
| 
|-
| 1500 m
| 1:41.04
| align=left | Shani Davis
| 
| align=right | 11 December 2009
| align=left | Utah Olympic Oval, Salt Lake City
| 
|-
| 5000 m
| 6:03.32
| align=left | Sven Kramer
| 
| align=right | 17 November 2007
| align=left | Olympic Oval, Calgary
| 
|-
| 10000 m
| 12:36.30
| align=left | Ted-Jan Bloemen
| 
| align=right | 21 November 2015
| align=left | Utah Olympic Oval, Salt Lake City
| 
|-
| Team pursuit  (8 laps)
| 3:35.60
| align=left | Koen Verweij  Jan Blokhuijsen  Sven Kramer
| 
| align=right | 16 November 2013
| align=left | Utah Olympic Oval, Salt Lake City
| 
|}

Women

{| class="wikitable" border="1" style="text-align:center"
|-
! Distance
! Time
! Holder(s)
! Nat.
! Date
! Venue
! Reference
|-
| 500 m
| 36.36
| align=left | Lee Sang-hwa
| 
| align=right | 16 November 2013
| align=left | Utah Olympic Oval, Salt Lake City
| 
|-
| 1000 m
| 1:12.18
| align=left | Brittany Bowe
| 
| align=right | 22 November 2015
| align=left | Utah Olympic Oval, Salt Lake City
| 
|-
| 1500 m
| 1:50.85
| align=left | Heather Richardson-Bergsma
| 
| align=right | 21 November 2015
| align=left | Utah Olympic Oval, Salt Lake City
| 
|-
| 3000 m
| 3:53.34
| align=left | Cindy Klassen
| 
| align=right | 18 March 2006
| align=left | Olympic Oval, Calgary
| 
|-
| 5000 m
| 6:42.66
| align=left | Martina Sáblíková
| 
| align=right | 18 February 2011
| align=left | Utah Olympic Oval, Salt Lake City
| 
|-
| Team pursuit  (6 laps)
| 2:55.79
| align=left | Kristina Groves  Christine Nesbitt  Brittany Schussler
| 
| align=right | 6 December 2009
| align=left | Olympic Oval, Calgary
| 
|}
 New records :

Men's standings

500 m

1000 m

1500 m

5000 and 10000 m

Mass start

Team pursuit

Team sprint

Grand World Cup

Women's standings

500 m

1000 m

1500 m

3000 and 5000 m

Mass start

Team pursuit

Team sprint

Grand World Cup

References

External links 
International Skating Union

Results at ISUresults.eu

 
16-17
Isu Speed Skating World Cup, 2016-17
Isu Speed Skating World Cup, 2016-17